Marthandam  is a major trade centre in Kuzhithurai municipality across National Highway (NH 47) in the Kanyakumari district of Tamil Nadu, India. Formerly known as Thoduvetty (another name for the Marthandam market region), it was a portion of Kanyakumari district which was added to the state of Tamil Nadu on 1 November 1956.

Marthandam is the largest town in the district. It derived its name from the founder and ruler of Travancore, Anizham Thirunal Marthanda Varma. Marthandam is famous for honey, cashew nut processing, rubber and hand-embroidered motifs. The area is among the most fertile lands of Tamil Nadu with substantial vegetation, and a river adjoining. It is also a major trade center due to its location bordering Kerala.

History

The Chitharal Jain Monuments are the ruins of a Jain training centre from the 9th century CE, on a small hill. It is famous for the hillock which has a cave containing rock-cut sculptures of Thirthankaras and attendant deities carved inside and outside dating back to the 9th century. Among the rock-cut relief sculptures is a figure of the goddess Dharmadevi. Jain influence in this region was due to the King Mahendravarman I (610-640).

Southern Division, or Padmanabhapuram Division till 1921 and Trivandrum Division from 1921 to 1949, was one of the administrative divisions of the princely state of Travancore. It covered the five taluks of Agastiswaram, Eraniel, Kalkulam, Thovalay and Vilavancode and was administered by a civil servant of rank Diwan Peishkar equivalent to a District Collector in British India. The Southern division was predominantly Tamil-speaking in contrast to the other three divisions where Malayalam was spoken. In 1920, the neighbouring Trivandrum was also merged with the Southern division. In 1949, the princely state of Travancore was dissolved and the Southern Division was included in the Travancore-Cochin state of India.
In 1956, the Tamil-speaking taluks of Southern Division were transferred to the neighbouring Madras State as per the States Reorganisation Act of 1956 and forms the present-day Kanyakumari district of Tamil Nadu. The Malayalam-speaking taluks of the erstwhile Trivandrum division form the Thiruvananthapuram district of Kerala. The headquarters of the Southern Division were at Padmanabhapuram.

Education

Colleges

BWDA Polytechnic College
CSI Institute of Technology.
Malankara Catholic College, Mariagiri.
Marthandam College of Engineering and Technology.
Nesamony Memorial Christian College.

Industries in Marthandam

Industrial Opportunities in Marthandam

There are rubber, coir, fruit based and wood-based industries. The influence of both Tamil and Kerala artisans produces unique designs and furniture works. Wood industries, directly and indirectly, employ a few thousand people.

Geography

It is one of the most fertile lands of Tamil Nadu and has the climatic conditions of Kerala. It has a railway line connecting the capital of Kerala, Trivandrum, with the southernmost tip of India, Kanyakumari. Marthandam is well connected to Chennai, Mumbai, Bangalore by rail service also bus service to all over Tamil Nadu. The river Thamirabarani runs through the Marthandam city and every year a festival known as Vavubali will be celebrated at the banks of river Thamirabarani.

Climate

Transport

Roads
Marthandam lies in the National Highway(NH66) connecting Kanyakumari to Panvel. The main bus stand of Marthandam is located along the Market Road in Kaalaichanthai. This bus stand is the base for MTM-based TNSTC local and long-distance buses. KeralaSRTC buses and also SETC buses to Chennai, Bengaluru, Ooty, Vellore and Pondichery operate from here. Private long-distance buses departing from Marthandam operate from various parts of the town. Marthandam is one of the heavy traffic area in the two-lane section of NH544. The recent steel flyover which spans more than 2 km has considerably reduced the traffic. Other major state roads from Marthandam include MTM-Pechiparai road via Kuzhithurai, MTM-Kulasekaram road and MTM-Colachal road.

Air

Railways
It has a railway line connecting the capital of Kerala, Trivandrum, with the southernmost tip of India, Kanyakumari. Kuzhithurai station serves the town of Marthandam and is found to be centered between Trivandrum — Kanyakumari railway line. This railway station collection is more than seven crore per annum and a daily passenger patronage of more than 50,000 people. The station has two platforms and falls on the Kanyakumari—Trivandrum line in the Trivandrum Division of the Southern Railway zone. 
Marthandam is well connected to Chennai, Mumbai, Delhi, Howrah and all over India by the rail service. Kuzhithurai West is the secondary station where only local trains halt.

Religion

The Lord Ayyappa temple in Marthandam is at the banks of Kuzhithurai River.
This temple is known as either "Vettuvenni temple" or "Vedi Vechan Kovil". The latter one due to the fire cracker being burst at the temple as a mark of prayer to Lord Ayyappa. This temple is just by the side of National Highway NH-47 connecting Trivandrum with Nagercoil.

Sree Krishna temple at Kannacode in Marthandam. Name of the locality Kannacode is derived from the presence of this temple dedicated to Sree Krishna (Kanna) who is in Balagopala form in this temple. Historical records say that Travancore king Sri Vishakam Thirunal who ruled from 1880 AD to 1885 AD used to pray every month at this temple to ward off his BudhagrahaDosham. Renovation of the temple has been recently done by contribution from devotees. Situated in a peaceful location on the banks of Tamiravaruni river, this temple is called Guruvayoor of Kanyakumari district. On the Rohini star day of every Tamil/Malayalam month, SriSudarsana homam is conducted in this temple.

Alappancode Sree Easwarakla Boothathan Temple is just  from Kuzhithura Jn to wards Arumana Road and adjacent to Melpuram Jn. In Tamil Nadu it is the only temple where a large number of caparisoned elephants are participating in the annual festival. Every year more than thirty-five decorated elephants join the procession. The procession will start from the Kariyathara Temple in Anducode and finish in Alappancode, and the procession will cover about seven kilometers (4 miles). Devotees from Kerala and Tamil Nadu gather here to see the festival. The festival will be held on the last Saturday of December.

The Sree Chamundesari temple is just adjacent to the Mahadevar temple. Though the temples are under the Devaswam board, the temples are maintained by a trust called Kuzhithurai Sree Mahadevar Shektra Samrakshna Samithi; with the help of devotees of this surrounding area, the committee has spent a huge amount for the renovation of the temples. A large number of devotees from Kanyakumari and Trivadrum District visit Sree Chamundeswari Temple for special poojas, especially unmarried girls, wishing for a good marriage life.

Anjukannu Kalungu Sree Madan Thampuram Yakshi Amman Temple Festivals are: Yearly festival  for 7 days, Shivrathri (Shivalaya Ottam), Saraswathy pooja, Deepawali, Thrikkarthika, Monthly Ammavasya, yearly Kumbhabishegam, Pongal. The main festivals celebrated there are Samivaravu, Sivarathri, Vavubali, and Onam.

The Marthandam CSI Church in the Main Road at the junction was built by Rev. Robert Sinclair born in Scotland who came to India after his ordination as a minister on 3 August 1910, in Scotland. He succeeded Rev. H.I Hacker in 1919 and came to Marthandam and served from 1920 to 1939.

Religious festivals

Onam and Christmas celebrations are massive in Marthandam. In this district, Christmas is celebrated more than the rest of Tamil Nadu.
Vishu is also celebrated well in this district due to its neighbour Kerala and presence of Malayalam-speaking people throughout the border of district.
Also festivals such as Deepavali, New Year, Ramzan, and Easter are celebrated in this district.

Attractions

Tourist spots nearby
Padmanabhapuram Palace

Udayagiri Fort

Thirparappu waterfalls

Pechiparai Reservoir

Thengapattanam Beach

Mathur Aqueduct

The Mathur Aqueduct is one of the longest and highest aqueducts in South Asia and is a popular tourist spot in Kanyakumari District. The aqueduct is built across the Pahrali river, a small river that originates in the Mahendragiri Hills of the Western Ghats. Mathur Aqueduct itself carries water of the Pattanamkal canal for irrigation over the Pahrali river, from one hill to another, for a distance of close to one kilometer. This Aqueduct is necessitated due to the undulating land terrain of the area, which is also adjacent to the hills of the Western Ghats.

Mathur Aqueduct is a concrete structure held up by 28 huge pillars; the maximum height of the pillars reaching . The trough is partly covered on top with concrete slabs, allowing people to walk on the bridge and also see the water going through the trough. Some of the pillars are set in rocks of the Pahrali river, though some of the pillars are set in hills on either side.

Road access allows one to drive in to one side of the Aqueduct (up to one end), while it is also possible to drive into the foot of the Aqueduct (the level where the Pahrali flows) on the opposite side. There is also a huge flight of stairs (made in recent times) that allows one to climb from the level of the Pahrali river to the trough.

Folk arts
There are several Folk Arts practiced in temples for Sastha, Sudalaimadan and Yakshiamman. Villupattu is especially for Sastha temples and Kaniankoothu is practiced for Sudalaimadan. Grand Tamil poet Avvaiyar temples are found along with Yakshi amman temples and worship of teachings of Avvaiyar can be observed

Many Folk arts and dances are popular in this district. They are played during the time of festivals in temples, celebrations in schools etc. Bow Song (Villu Paatu) is an ancient form of musical- storytelling art of southern Tamil Nadu. Villu Paatu has been especially popular in Thovalai and neighbouring areas of the district.

Bow, the age-old weapon of warriors - paradoxically lends itself to be used as a primary musical instrument for the Villu Pattu artists. There are Udukku, Kudam, Thala, Kattai, etc. as supplementary instruments in their performances. Udukku, mentioned in the ancient Tamil literature as Thudi, is a small drum with a slender middle portion which is held in the left hand and played by the fingers of the right hand. Occasionally, the Villu Pattu team divides itself into two groups, each trying to prove opposite points-of-view of a subject. This is called Lavani Pattu. The songs used by the Villu Pattu artists are mostly traditional folk-songs.

Thiruvathira Kali occupies the pride of place among the folk dances. It resembles Kummi and is played especially during Onam festival. The players are young girls. The necessary number of girls is 8,10,12 or 16 for each dance. They move round and sing in chorus. Each girl strikes the stick (Kole) which she holds in each hand, and the striking of the sticks and the steps, which she makes are rhythmical to the tune.

Kalial is a folk dance played by group of men or boys in the country side. A group leader sings songs and keeps time with cymbals. The players stand in a circle with sticks in their hand and dance round a lighted lamp repeating the songs sung by the leader. They turn, twist, lean forward and backward, squat and move round singing to the tune. At the beginning the steps are elaborate and at times, they are also very quick. When invited to perform in a function, the players generally begin the dance with an invocation for heavenly aid and conclude the dance with a torch - dance using lighted torches. This folk dance exhibits the artistic and recreative life of the country side.

Kathakali is a unique form of drama, which has its origin in Travancore. Kathakali (story-dance) is a relatively recent (fifteenth or sixteenth century) development of earlier dances, which, like dances every where, arose out of religious expression through symbolical action. In this art-form, the characters express their ideas not by words, but by significant gestures. In Kanyakumari District, it is now played in the temples at Thiruvattar, Thirparappu, Ponmana, Kuzhithura, Neyyoor, Nattalam and Munchira during the time of festivals.

Ottam Thullal is a form of story telling. It is a popular for of amusement, staged in the temple premises and Malayalam is the language commonly used. Ottam Thullal is now played in the temples of Thiruvattar, Thirparappu, Ponmana, Nattalam and Thirunanthikara in the district during the time of festivals.

Kalari, is an ancient martial art of Kerala. A tradition believed to have been founded by Parasurama is known as Vadakkan Kalari; another is credited to Agasthiar in which the emphasis is on striking at vital points of the body and not on weapons, even through sword, knife, Urumi (rolling sword), Mankombu (horns of a deer), Kandakkodali, (a kind of axe), mazhu (a kind of axe) etc., are also used. Kanyakumari district is home to an indigenous form of martial arts called 'Adimurai' or 'naadan', which is often confused with the Kalari of Kerala, in spite of its uniqueness.

Adjacent communities 
The following towns are near to Marthandam:
  
Kuzhithurai, 3 km  
Pacode, 4 km 
Thirunattalam, 5 km

References

External links

Kumari Arivial Peravai
CSI Marthandam
Kappukadu
Kuzhithurai Diocese

Cities and towns in Kanyakumari district
Kanyakumari